Carlton Anthony Martial (born April 11, 1999) is an American college football linebacker for the Troy Trojans. He began his season as a walk-on and was selected as a freshman All-American in 2018. He was also a finalist for the Burlsworth Trophy in 2021.

Early years
Martial was born in 1999, the son of football coach Philbert Martial. He began playing football at age three with his father's team, the Cottage Hill Steelers. He played at the quarterback, cornerback, and running back positions as a youth player and also played basketball. He attended McGill–Toolen Catholic High School in Mobile, Alabama. He played football at the linebacker position in high school, helping the team to back-to-back state title games, tallying 197 tackles as a junior and 120 tackles as a senior. At five feet, nine inches, he was regarded as small and did not receive any NCAA Division I Football Bowl Subdivision (FBS) scholarship offers. He had offers from Alabama A&M, North Alabama, Jackson State, and Alcorn State, and preferred walk-on offers from Troy and Auburn.

Troy University

Walk-on
Martial enrolled at Troy University in Troy, Alabama, in 2017 as a preferred walk-on player. He redshirted in 2017 and played at the middle linebacker position as a redshirt freshman in 2018.

2018 season: Freshman All-America honors
In August 2018, The Montgomery Advertiser credited Martial for "working his butt off," resulting in a "meteoric rise ... from walk-on chum in practice and in-game towel-waving sideline crazy man to playing a key role." He tallied 76 tackles and helped the 2018 Troy Trojans to a 10–3 record and a victory in the Dollar General Bowl. He was also selected as a freshman All-American by USA Today and the Football Writers Association of America (FWAA).

2019 season
As a redshirt sophomore in 2019, Martial led the team with 126 tackles. He was the first Troy player to tally over 100 tackles in eight years. Against Texas State on November 16, he had two one-handed interceptions, one of which he returned 64 yards for a touchdown with eight seconds remaining in the game.

2020 season
As a redshirt junior in the COVID-shortened 2020 season, Martial was selected as a first-team pre-season All-American by the Walter Camp Football Foundation. He led the country with 113 tackles. He was the first Troy player since 2002 to register over 100 tackles in consecutive seasons. He also tallied a career-high 21 tackles, a sack and an interception against No. 11 Coastal Carolina.

2021 season
In 2021, Martial retained his junior status, as the 2020 season did not alter his status. He was selected in August 2021 as the Sun Belt Conference preseason Defensive Player of the Year. In November 2021, he was also selected as a finalist for the Burlsworth Trophy awarded each year to the most outstanding player who began his career as a walk-on.

2022 season
In January 2022, having another year of eligibility remaining due to the COVID year, Martial announced that he would return to try for a fifth season. He began the 2022 season needing 104 tackles to break the NCAA Division I FBS record for most tackles in a career. On November 12, 2022, he had his 546th tackle to break the prior record of 545 tackles set by Tim McGarigle of Northwestern.

College statistics

References

1999 births
Living people
Players of American football from Alabama
American football linebackers
Troy Trojans football players
Sportspeople from Mobile, Alabama